USS Glendoveer (SP-292) was a United States Navy patrol vessel in commission from 1917 to 1919.

Glendoveer was built as a civilian vessel of the same name in 1907 by the Jahncke Navigation Company at New Orleans, Louisiana. The U.S. Navy purchased her from her owner, Ernest L. Jahncke, on 3 May 1917 for World War I service as a patrol vessel. She was commissioned on 9 May 1917 as USS Glendoveer (SP-292).

Assigned to the 8th Naval District, Glendoveer served in Pensacola Harbor at Pensacola, Florida, at New Orleans, and at Biloxi Mississippi, as a section patrol boat and inspection boat for merchant ships. She occasional also served as a mail boat and on rescue missions; she responded to a distress call from a seaplane lost in the fog off Pensacola on 14 February 1918 and succeeded in towing it into the safety of the harbor.

Glendoveer continued her patrolling duties until she was decommissioned on 8 February 1919 at New Orleans. She was stricken from the Navy List on 17 June 1919 and sold to Charles DeLerno on 2 September 1919.

References

NavSource Online: Section Patrol Craft Photo Archive: Glendoveer (SP 292)

Patrol vessels of the United States Navy
World War I patrol vessels of the United States
Ships built in New Orleans
1907 ships